Terry Baker (born 1941) is an American football quarterback.

Terry Baker may also refer to:

Terry Baker (Canadian football) (born 1962), Canadian footballer
Terry Baker (footballer) (born 1965), English association footballer
Terry Baker (politician) (born 1955/1956), American politician
Terry Baker, fictional character on Australian soap opera Neighbours